Beaumontel is a commune in the Eure department in the Normandy region in northern France.

Location
The commune lies on the Risle river, located between the plaine du Neubourg and the forest of Beaumont-le-Roger. The Paris-Cherbourg railway line passes through the commune.

History
The village was formerly known as Belmontel.  The village was originally part of Beaumont-le-Roger and had a common origin in lands belonging to the dukes of Normandy which were given to Judith of Brittany and later, to the monks of Bernay.

From the early 15th century until the French Revolution, the area belonged to the Val family.

Population

Economy
Its local economy is based on flour-milling, the production of charcoal and the manufacture of pasta products.

Sights
Parc Parissot

See also
Communes of the Eure department

References

External links

 Beaumontel website
 Parissot Park website  (in French)

Communes of Eure